Francis Norona is a Malayalam author. The Sensitive Father is a compilation of his short stories. Norona's writings are characterized by the faint expressions of coastal populations. Norona's writing became a frequent background for the lives of Latin Catholics who were expelled from Malayalam literature. His poetic language is a key contributor to the development of Malayalam letters. His novel The Gospel of the Neglected is the only work written about the life of the coastal people of Alappuzha.

Works

Novels 
The Gospel of the Neglected

Short Stories 
 Adam's Apple
 Darknight 
 Carpets
 Herb
The Sensitive Father

References 

Year of birth missing (living people)
Living people
Indian male writers
Malayalam-language writers